Imperial Noble Consort Huixian (1711 – 25 February 1745), of the Manchu Bordered Yellow Banner Gaogiya clan, was a consort of the Qianlong Emperor.

Life

Family background
Imperial Noble Consort Huixian's personal name was not recorded in history. She was a Han Chinese by birth.

 Father: Gao Bin (1683–1755), served as the Minister of Personnel from 1745–1747 and a Grand Secretary in the Wenyuan Library from 1747–1748. Gao Bin's first wife Lady Chen (her father Chen Alin was an Imperial Household Department staff captain belonging to Bordered Yellow Banner), second wife Lady Qi, third wife Lady Ma (her father Ma Weifan was an Imperial Household Department army officer). 
 Paternal grandfather: Gao Yanzhong , served as an Imperial Household Department staff captain (zuoling) belonging to Bordered Yellow Banner.
 Paternal grandmother: Lady Li
 Paternal uncles: Gao Shuming 高述明 (a regional commander in Gansu), Gao Yu 高鈺 (a regional commander in Jiangsu) 
 Mother: Lady Ma (father Ma Weifan, an Imperial Household Department army officer belonging to Plain White Banner). 
 One younger brother: Gao Heng 高恒, served as the Lianghuai Administrator of Salt Business, a Minister of the Imperial Household Department.
 Three younger sisters: Gao-jia-shi (Gaogiya), two of whom married respectively to an Eight Banners army commander E Shi of the Xilinjueluo (Sirin Gioro) family belonging to Bordered Blue Banner and an Imperial Household Department officer Han Jin belonging to Plain Yellow Banner.   
 Cousin Gao Jin (Qing Dynasty) 高晋 (father Gao Shuming), served as the Liangjiang Governor, Minister of Rites, and a Grand Secretary in the Wenhua Library. 
 Cousins: Gao-jia-shi (Gaogiya; father Gao Shuming), married respectively to Hu Zhao, an imperial bodyguard (shiwei) belonging to Plain Blue Banner, and Li Weiping, an Imperial Household Department staff captain (zuoling) belonging to Plain White Banner.

Yongzheng era
It is not known when Lady Gao become a lady-in-waiting, and then mistress, of Hongli, the fourth son of the Yongzheng Emperor. On 4 April 1734, she was elevated to his secondary consort. She was a beautiful and well educated woman with a great personality and many capabilities. Lady Gao also had a wonderful relationship with Lady Fuca, Hongli's Primary Consort, and during the Qianlong era she would directly assist Lady Fuca, now Empress, in managing the palace at large and caring for Empress Dowager Chongqing. She was greatly favored by her husband all her life.

Qianlong era
The Yongzheng Emperor died on 8 October 1735 and was succeeded by Hongli, who was enthroned as the Qianlong Emperor. Around the time, Gao Bin wrote a memorial to the Yongzheng Emperor, thanking him for a bunch of lychees, but it was too late as the emperor had already died when the memorial reached the palace, so the Qianlong Emperor replied in place of his father:

On 23 January 1738, Lady Gao was granted the title "Noble Consort". As she was the only woman in the imperial harem holding the rank of Noble Consort at the time, she did not receive any special title to distinguish her from the emperor's other consorts.

On 23 February 1745, when Lady Gao became critically ill, she was elevated to "Imperial Noble Consort" by the Qianlong Emperor. However, she never managed to attend the promotion ceremony because she died two days after the emperor announced his decision. In 1752, she was interred in the Yu Mausoleum of the Eastern Qing tombs.

Titles
 During the reign of the Kangxi Emperor (r. 1661–1722):
 Lady Gao (高氏; from 1711)
 During the reign of the Yongzheng Emperor (r. 1722–1735):
 Mistress (格格; date unknowm)
 Secondary Consort (from 4 April 1734)
 During the reign of the Qianlong Emperor (r. 1735–1796):
 Noble Consort  (from 23 January 1738), third rank consort
 Imperial Noble Consort (from 23 February 1745), second rank consort
 Imperial Noble Consort Huixian (from 26 February 1745)

In fiction and popular culture
 Portrayed by Fu Chong in Jiangshan Weizhong (2002)
 Portrayed by Tan Zhuo in Story of Yanxi Palace (2018)
 Portrayed by Tong Yao in Ruyi's Royal Love in the Palace (2018)

See also
 Ranks of imperial consorts in China#Qing
 Royal and noble ranks of the Qing dynasty

Notes

References
 
 
 
 

1711 births
1745 deaths
Consorts of the Qianlong Emperor